San José de Matanzas (also known as Matancitas) is a town in the María Trinidad Sánchez province of the Dominican Republic.

Sources 
 – World-Gazetteer.com

Populated places in María Trinidad Sánchez Province